Miguel Ángel González Estrada (born April 26, 1991, in Tampico, Tamaulipas) is a Mexican professional footballer who last played for C.D. Tepatitlán de Morelos.

External links
 
 

Living people
1991 births
Mexican footballers
Association football midfielders
Tampico Madero F.C. footballers
Altamira F.C. players
C.D. Tepatitlán de Morelos players
Ascenso MX players
Liga Premier de México players
Tercera División de México players
Footballers from Tamaulipas
Sportspeople from Tampico, Tamaulipas